Women's Overall World Cup 1967/1968

Final point standings

In Women's Overall World Cup 1967/68 the best three downhills, best three giant slaloms and best three slaloms count. Deductions are given in brackets.

References
 fis-ski.com

Women's overall
FIS Alpine Ski World Cup overall titles